Bongkoch "Bee" Satongun (born 1976) is a native Thai chef and restaurateur. She is known for her landmark restaurant, Paste Bangkok, which received a Michelin star. Chef Bee has expanded the Paste brand to neighboring Laos and recently opened a third venue in Australia.

In 2018, Satongun was named elit Vodka's Asia's Best Female Chef by the World's 50 Best Restaurants. She has been invited to cook at culinary events such as the annual Taste of Paris and Hong Kong Wine & Dine Festival 2018. Currently, Paste holds the 70th rank on Asia's 50 Best Restaurants 2021.

Early life and career
Prior to the opening of Paste, Satongun spent years researching the history of Thai cuisine, re-creating ancient recipes and culinary techniques alongside chef, husband and business partner, Jason Bailey.

Both Satongun and Bailey had humble beginnings, from Satongun's childhood memories of pounding herbs with pestle on mortar to assist her mother's street food stall business in Bangkok, to Bailey's experiences growing up in the Southern Highlands of Australia. She met her husband on one of his earlier research trips to Thailand.

Paste Bangkok
In 2012, Satongun and Bailey opened their first Paste restaurant in the neighborhood of Thonglor. In 2015, they opened a new iteration of Paste in Gaysorn shopping mall, located in Bangkok's Ratchaprasong district adjacent to the Intercontinental Hotel. At Paste, dishes represent regional Thai cuisine, taking inspiration from ancient Thai recipes and royal family cookbooks. Chef Bee hopes to do away with the notion of Thai food as 'cheap takeaway', and re-frame the cuisine in the minds of her diners.

In 2018, Paste Bangkok was awarded its first Michelin star in the inaugural Michelin Guide Bangkok. Paste Bangkok retained its one-Michelin-star rating in 2019. As of 2021, it retains its one Michelin star.

Other restaurants and pursuits
In 2018, Satongun and Bailey opened their first overseas branch of Paste, Paste Laos at the Apsara in the UNESCO World Heritage-listed ancient town of Luang Prabang. Currently, Bailey is working on the development of Paste in Australia.

List of awards

Winner of Most-Loved Thai Fine Dining Restaurant by Time Out, 2016
10 Best Michelin-rated Restaurants in Bangkok by The Guardian, 2017
Tatler Thailand's Top 20 Best Restaurants, 2017, 2018, 2019, 2020, 2021
elit Vodka's Asia's Best Female Chef by World's 50 Best Restaurants, 2018
One Michelin star, Michelin Guide Bangkok, 2018, 2019, 2020, 2021
 #31 on Asia's 50 Best Restaurants, 2018
Best Thai Fine Dining by Top Tables Bangkok, 2018
Leading Woman in Hospitality by Tourism Authority of Thailand, 2018
Thailand Chef Ambassador by Gault&Millau Guide, 2018
 #28 on Asia's 50 Best Restaurants, 2019
 #29 on OAD Asia's Top 100 Restaurants, 2020
 #38 on Asia's 50 Best Restaurants 2020
 #70 on Asia's 50 Best Restaurants, 2021

References

Bee Satongun
1976 births
Living people
Bee Satongun